Raam Jethmal Punjabi is an Indian-Indonesian media magnate and president of Multivision Plus.  In 2001, due to his production of soap operas, he was referred to as "Indonesia's own soap king".

Early life
He was born in Surabaya, East Java to parents of Indian (Sindhi) descent. His nephew is Manoj Punjabi.

Career

Filmography

As producer

 Special Silencers (1979)
 Bodoh-bodoh mujur (1981)
 Ferocious Female Freedom Fighters (1982) 
 Kamp tawanan wanita (1983)
 Itu bisa diatur (1984)
 The Stabilizer (1986)
 Pengantin baru (1986)
 Pembalasan rambu (1986)
 Java Burn (1988)
 The Intruder (1989)
 Kabut asmara (1994)
 Panji manusia milenium (2001) (TV series)
 Bidadari (2001) (TV series)
 Kiss Kis Ko (2004)
 Buruan cium gue! (2004)
 Satu kecupan (2004)

 Jatuh cinta lagi (2006)
 Kuntilanak (2006)
 Kangen (I Miss You) (2007)
 Kuntilanak 2 (2007)
 Pulau hantu (2007)
 Kawin kontrak (2008)
 Kuntilanak 3 (2008)
 D.O. (Drop Out) (2008)
 Pulau hantu 2 (2008)
 Kawin kontrak lagi (2008)
 MBA: Married by Accident (2008)
 Kirun + Adul (2009)
 Jamila dan Sang Presiden (2009)
 Punk in Love (2009)
 Nazar (2009)
 Toilet 105 (2010)
 Soekarno: Indonesia Merdeka

As executive producer
 Petualangan 100 Jam (2004)
 Pesan dari surga (2006)
As writer
 Perawan rimba (1983)
 Kamp tawanan wanita (1983)

References

External links
 
 
 
 

Indonesian businesspeople
Indonesian billionaires
Indonesian people of Indian descent
Indonesian Hindus
Indonesian people of Sindhi descent
People from Surabaya
Living people
Year of birth missing (living people)
Indonesian television personalities
Indonesian television producers
Indonesian film producers
Soap opera producers